is a Japanese professional footballer who plays as a winger for  club JEF United Chiba.

Career
After spending three years with Yokohama F. Marinos on a type 2 contract while finishing high school, Tsubaki signed his first professional contract ahead of the 2019 season.   He debuted for the Tricolore as a second half substitute in a 4-0 win away to Hokkaido Consadole Sapporo in the J.League Cup on 8 May 2019.

Tsubaki has been transferred to Giravanz Kitakyushu in the J3 League on 15 August 2019 on loan. After Kitakyushu have become the champions of the 2019 J3 League, then have been promoted to the 2020 J2 League, Tsubaki's loan term to Kitakyushu has been extended to another season. After playing 34 matches with 2 goals out of 37 in the season, Tsubaki was transferred back to Yokohama as of the end of November 2020, then was transferred immediately to Melbourne City FC, the 2019-20 A-League runners-up, on loan as of 1 December 2020. Following the conclusion of the 2020-21 A-League season, in which Melbourne City won the premiership and championship, Tsubaki departed Melbourne City and returned to Yokohama.

After a loan to J2 League club Mito Hollyhock for the 2022 season, it was announced in December 2022 that Tsubaki would be leaving Yokohama F. Marinos on a permanent basis and joining JEF United Chiba for the 2023 season.

Career statistics

Honours
 Giravanz Kitakyushu
J3 League : 2019

 Melbourne City
A-League : 2020–21 Championship and Premiership

References

External links

2000 births
Living people
Association football people from Tokyo
Japanese footballers
J1 League players
J2 League players
J3 League players
A-League Men players
Yokohama F. Marinos players
Giravanz Kitakyushu players
Melbourne City FC players
Mito HollyHock players
JEF United Chiba players
Expatriate soccer players in Australia
Japanese expatriate sportspeople in Australia
Association football midfielders